Hunter MacKenzie Austin is an American voice actress. In teen life, she was a magazine journalist of Tiger Beat, Glamour and LA Weekly.

Filmography

Anime
 Angel Tales - Ayumi the Turtle
 Daphne in the Brilliant Blue - Bao, Clyde, Tsukasa Takagi
 Ghost Talker's Daydream - Ghost Girl
 Girls Bravo - Lisa Fukuyama
 Gun X Sword - Bunny, Shino (Ep. 24)
 Haibane Renmei - Hikari
 I's - Yuka Morisaki
 Ikki Tousen - Kaku Bunwa
 Kamichu! - Chou
 L/R: Licensed by Royalty - Julia, Leila
 The Melody of Oblivion - Q-chan
 Mermaid Forest - Sayori, Yukie (Ep. 12–13)
 Monster - Helene (Ep. 54)
 Paranoia Agent - Kanie (Ep. 10), Yuichi's Teacher (Ep. 2–3)
 R.O.D. The TV - Michelle Cheung
 Starship Girl Yamamoto Yohko - Modoka Mido
 Strawberry Eggs - Sumrie Amagasaki

Video games
 Final Fantasy IV - Palom
 Fire Emblem Awakening - Nowi
 Fire Emblem Heroes - Clarine, Nowi, Rebecca
 Rune Factory: Tides of Destiny - Pandora, Quinn, Child (Boy)

References

External links

Living people
American video game actresses
American voice actresses
21st-century American actresses
Year of birth missing (living people)